The Walnut Creek Baptist Church is a historic church located at the end of Walnut Creek Church Road, about  northwest of Simsboro.

Built circa 1870, this well preserved country church is a four bay raised wooden structure. The cemetery, which is a contributing property to the historic church, was in use since the 1860s.

The church was added to the National Register of Historic Places on October 4, 1984.

See also
 National Register of Historic Places listings in Lincoln Parish, Louisiana

References

Baptist churches in Louisiana
Churches on the National Register of Historic Places in Louisiana
Buildings and structures completed in 1870
Buildings and structures in Lincoln Parish, Louisiana
National Register of Historic Places in Lincoln Parish, Louisiana